Bothwell and Uddingston  is one of the 20 electoral wards of South Lanarkshire Council. Created in 2007, the ward elects three councillors using the single transferable vote electoral system and covers an area with a population of 13,261 people.

The ward has politically been split between Labour, the Scottish National Party (SNP) and the Conservatives with each party holding one seat at every election since the ward's creation.

Boundaries
The ward was created following the Fourth Statutory Reviews of Electoral Arrangements ahead of the 2007 Scottish local elections. As a result of the Local Governance (Scotland) Act 2004, local elections in Scotland would use the single transferable vote electoral system from 2007 onwards so Bothwell and Uddingston was formed from an amalgamation of several previous first-past-the-post wards. It contained all of the former Bothwell South, Uddingston and Uddingston South/Bothwell wards. As its name suggests, Bothwell and Uddingston centres on the towns of Bothwell and Uddingston bounded by the River Clyde to the west and south, and the M74 motorway to the north and east. Bothwell and Uddingston is located in the north of South Lanarkshire with its northwestern boundary coinciding with the council's border with Glasgow City Council and its eastern boundary coinciding with the council's border with North Lanarkshire Council. Following the Fifth Statutory Reviews of Electoral Arrangements ahead of the 2017 Scottish local elections, the ward's boundaries were unchanged.

Councillors

Election Results

2022 election

2017 election

2012 election

2007 election

Notes

References

Wards of South Lanarkshire
Bothwell and Uddingston